Geoffrey Drake (1911–1995) was an English production designer and art director. He was nominated for an Academy Award in the category Best Art Direction for the film Young Winston.

Selected filmography
 Young Winston (1972)

References

External links

1911 births
1995 deaths
English art directors
British film designers